Anjana is a village in the tehsil/mandal of Pura Bazar in the Faizabad district of Uttar Pradesh, India.

References

Villages in Faizabad district